WVIG (105.5 FM, "The Legend") is a radio station broadcasting a classic country music format. Licensed to West Terre Haute, Indiana, United States, the station serves the Terre Haute area. The station is currently owned by David Crooks, through licensee DLC Media, Inc.

WVIG is not licensed to broadcast in the digital hybrid HD format.

On January 30, 2017, DLC Media took over ownership of WZJK as the previous call sign, WWVR, moved to Midwest Communications 98.5 signal as "98.5 The River WWVR", replacing AC 98.5 WBOW. The new website for the station was 985theriver.com. Upon the move, 105.5 flipped to variety hits as "105.5 Jack FM", with new call sign WZJK.

In August 2021, DLC Media announced that they would sell WVIG 95.9 to Educational Media Foundation, a not-for-profit Christian ministry based in Rockland, CA, which is the parent company of K-Love and Air1 – the nation's largest contemporary Christian music radio networks. The WVIG call sign was eventually to be moved to 105.5 after the sale of the current 95.9 WVIG was approved by the FCC. The classic country format of 95.9 WVIG was moved to WZJK 105.5 FM, replacing the Jack FM Adult Variety Hits format. 95.9 WVIG then was taken silent. 

The station assumed the WVIG call sign from 95.9 on January 26, 2022.

Previous logos

References

External links

VIG (FM)
Radio stations established in 1967
1967 establishments in Indiana
Classic country radio stations in the United States